The Western Divisional Board of the North American Gaelic Athletic Association (GAA) colloquially San Francisco GAA is the governing body of hurling, camogie, and Gaelic football in the San Francisco Bay Area.  It is affiliated to the North American Board.  

Since its inception, its games have been played at various venues throughout the city of San Francisco on municipal fields rented from the city, such as Beach Chalet playing fields in Golden Gate Park, and Boxer Stadium at Balboa Park. From 2009 onward, its games were held at Páirc na nGael, a facility that was renovated and leased by the GAA on Treasure Island.  

The playing season runs from mid-April until late August. Local San Francisco championship winners advance to the NACB Playoffs that take place over Labor Day weekend every year. The playoffs rotate between cities like Chicago, Boston, Denver, Philadelphia and San Francisco.  They were previously held in San Francisco in 1993, 1997, and 2001. The Continental Youth Championships return to San Francisco in 2009 and will be played at Páirc na nGael, as will the adult national finals in 2010.

Clubs
Men's Football

Celts
Michael Cusack's
Sean Treacy's
Peninsula Naomh Padraig / Shannon Rangers
Sons of Ború
Ulster
Young Irelanders / St Brendan's

Hurling
Na Fianna
Naomh Padraig
St Josephs
Rovers
Stanford University
University of California, Berkeley
University of California, Davis

Ladies Football
Clan na Gael
Fog City Harps
Saoirse
Cailiní Ceilteacha

Camogie
Shamrocks

Youth
Irish Football Youth League
Éire Óg

Páirc na nGael
Páirc na nGael was opened on Sunday, December 7, 2008 by GAA President Nickey Brennan prior to the Vodafone GAA All-Star football game starring the top inter-county Gaelic footballers in Ireland.  It contains three regulation sized Gaelic fields for hurling and football spanning  covering the space of three city blocks.  Páirc na nÓg is the name of the youth field further to the east on the island adjacent to the home grounds of the Golden Gate Rugby Club.  Páirc na nGael's development was funded by financial and labor donations from the Irish community in San Francisco, and a donation from the GAA in Ireland.  A disused adjacent elementary school building was later remodeled to become a community centre and function room  and funding for this was secured from the Irish Government.

References

External links
San Francisco GAA Official website
Irish Football Youth League Official website
North American Board official website
GAA official website
Continental Youth Championships official website

North American GAA
Gaelic games governing bodies in the United States